Candelaria is an extinct genus of owenettid parareptile. It was the first procolophonomorph discovered in the Santa Maria Formation at the geopark of Paleorrota, in the town of Candelária, by Llewellyn Ivor Price in 1942 and described in 1947.

References

Bibliography

External links 

 Sociedade Brasileira de paleontologia

Procolophonomorphs
Triassic parareptiles
Middle Triassic reptiles of South America
Triassic Brazil
Fossils of Brazil
Santa Maria Formation
Fossil taxa described in 1947
Taxa named by Llewellyn Ivor Price
Prehistoric reptile genera